André van der Merwe is a South African urologist. He is currently head of urology at the University of Stellenbosch and an associate professor at Tygerberg Hospital. He is best known for conducting the world's first successful penis transplant in 2014. He also performed the first laparoscopic kidney removal in South Africa.

Life 
Van der Merwe grew up in the town of Sutherland in the Northern Cape province of South Africa. His childhood dream was to become an astronomer. He is a fan of singer Barbra Streisand.

Qualifications
As of 2014, Van der Merwe held the following qualifications: Membership of the Royal College of Surgeons (MRCS) of England, MRCS of Edinburgh, Fellowship of the College of Urologists of South Africa, a Master of Medicine in Urology, and a Master of Clinical Epidemiology.

Career
Apart from his positions at the University of Stellenbosch and the Tygerberg Hospital, Van der Merwe is a National Deputy Delegate for South Africa with the Société Internationale d'Urologie.

As a urologist, Van der Merwe regularly performs kidney transplants. In 2008, he performed the first laparoscopic removal of kidney in South Africa. The kidney was removed from a living donor to be donated to her sister. The duration of the surgery was four hours in total, which is longer than a traditional kidney removal. Van der Merwe said that the longer surgery time was offset by the much quicker patient recovery time. Van der Merwe said that the new method of organ removal could attract up to 40% more donors than there were at the time.

Penis transplant 
On 11 December 2014, Van der Merwe led a team of surgeons through a nine-hour surgery at the Tygerberg Hospital, in order to surgically attach a penis from a deceased donor to an anonymous patient, who had to have his penis amputated after a ceremonial circumcision went wrong two years prior to the surgery (three years prior to the announcement of the surgery). The surgery was announced by the University of Stellenbosch's faculty of medicine and health sciences on 13 March 2015. Van der Merwe predicted the transplanted penis to be fully functional in two years' time. Van der Merwe was 46 years old when the surgery was announced. Following the surgery, some media outlets dubbed him "Dr. Dick".

Accolades
In 2008, Van der Merwe was awarded the Karl Storz Golden Cystoscope for the most outstanding young urologist in South Africa.

In 2012, at the congress of the South African Urological Association, he received the Sanofi-Aventis award for urological excellence and outstanding service in furthering the practice of Urology in South Africa.

References 

South African urologists
Fellows of the Royal College of Surgeons
Afrikaner people
Living people
1960s births
Organ transplantation
Academic staff of Stellenbosch University